Thomas Henry Kane (born January 14, 1964) is a Canadian former professional football player.

Football career
Born in Montreal, Quebec, Kane played college football at Syracuse University.

A third-round draft pick, Kane played for the Seattle Seahawks from 1988 to 1992, when his season ended early due to ankle and knee injuries. The Seahawks cut him during training camp in the following year, and Kane moved to the Canadian Football League. He played five games for the Toronto Argonauts in 1994.Ex-NFL star Tommy Kane sentenced 18 years, November 11, 2004. CBC Sports.

At the end of his pro career, Kane volunteered at youth football camps sponsored by Montreal's Westend Sport Association, which he had attended as a youth. While with the Argonauts, he donated a year's salary to the Centre.
Kane is of Black Nova Scotian descent.

Crime and legal proceedings
In 1988, while at Syracuse University, Kane was arrested for assaulting a police officer after the officer attempted to have his illegally-parked car towed. He was charged with second-degree assault, second-degree obstructing governmental administration and resisting arrest. He was subsequently sentenced to community service.

On November 30, 2003, Kane severely beat and then stabbed his estranged wife, Tammara Shaikh, in his mother's house in LaSalle, Quebec. Shaikh, 35, died in the arms of a church counsellor from Kane's church who had accompanied her to the home with the intention of escorting Kane to a detox center. The couple had recently separated.

Originally charged with second-degree murder, Kane pleaded guilty to manslaughter for the act. Prosecutors took his depression into account, agreeing to the lesser count. There was a dispute as to whether he intended to murder his wife and claimed during his trial that he didn't remember the attack fully. Kane was ultimately sentenced to 18 years in prison.

In 2010, Quebec judge Clement Gascon ordered Kane to pay damages of $590,000 to Tammara Shaikh's family. $125,000 was awarded to each of Kane and Shaikh's four children and $90,000 to Tammara's sister, Ava Shaikh, who had gained legal custody of the children after Tammara's murder. In late 2015, the Canadian Parole Board approved Kane for six months of day parole while he continued to serve his 18 year sentence.

Popular culture
 On November 22, 2014, Investigation Discovery aired this story in season 3, episode 3 of the original series Fatal Vows in an episode entitled Big League Murder.

References 

1964 births
Canadian Football League announcers
Living people
Sportspeople from Montreal
Canadian football people from Montreal
American football wide receivers
Canadian football wide receivers
Syracuse Orange football players
Seattle Seahawks players
Toronto Argonauts players
Canadian players of American football
Players of Canadian football from Quebec
Canadian people convicted of manslaughter
Prisoners and detainees of Canada
Anglophone Quebec people
Canadian people of Black Nova Scotian descent
Ed Block Courage Award recipients